The Maha Bandula Park or Maha Bandula Garden (also spelt Mahabandula or Mahabandoola) is a public park, located in downtown Yangon, Burma. The park is bounded by Maha Bandula Garden Street in the east, Sule Pagoda Road in the west, Konthe Road in the south and Maha Bandula Road in the north, and is surrounded by some of the important buildings in the area such as the Sule Pagoda, the Yangon City Hall and the High Court. The park is named after General Maha Bandula who fought against the British in the First Anglo-Burmese War (1824–1826).

History
 

The park dates to 1867 to 1868, founded as Fytche Square in honour of the then Chief Commissioner of British Burma, Albert Fytche. The site was previously a vacant, swampy site originally known as Tank Square, which was cleared and laid out as a public recreation ground. A white marble statue of Queen Victoria was placed in the center of the park in 1896, gifted by a wealthy Armenian firm in Rangoon. After 1935, the park was renamed Bandula Square, reflecting rising nationalist sentiment.

After 1948, the Independence Monument, an obelisk in commemoration of Burmese independence from the British in 1948, was installed at the center of the park, replacing the statue of Queen Victoria.The statue of Queen Victoria was brought back to England after Myanmar Independence. The architect of this Independence Monument Sithu U Tin who is the same architect for City Hall. The park was remodelled in 2012.

References

Buildings and structures in Yangon
Parks in Myanmar
Tourist attractions in Yangon